William Thomas Binney (August 29, 1897 – April 30, 1967) was a Canadian professional ice hockey player. He played with the Saskatoon Sheiks, Calgary Tigers, Edmonton Eskimos of the Western Canada Hockey League.

References

1897 births
1967 deaths
Calgary Tigers players
Canadian ice hockey goaltenders
Edmonton Eskimos (ice hockey) players
Ice hockey people from Manitoba
Saskatoon Sheiks players